The Argonaut Handicap was an American Thoroughbred horse race first run in 1940 at Hollywood Park Racetrack in Inglewood, California. A one-mile race on dirt, it was open to horses age three and older.

In 1956, Swaps won this race while setting a new world record for one mile with time of 1:33 1/5.

It was last run in 1978.

Winners 
1978 - Radar Ahead
1977 - Text
1976 - L'Heureux
1975 - Forceten
1974 - Carry The Banner
1973 - Out of the East
1972 - Kentuckian
1971 - Violonor
1970 - Western Welcome
1969 - Tell
1968 - First Mate
1967 - Tumble Wind
1966 - Exhibitionist
1965 - Carpenter's Rule
1964 - Close By
1963 - Oppo
1962 - Doc Jocoy
1961 - Mr. America
1960 - T. V. Lark 
1959 - Hillsdale
1958 - Round Table 
1957 - Terrang
1956 - Swaps
1955 - Curragh King
1954 - Curragh King
1953 - Fleet Bird
1952 - Admiral Drake
1951 - Be Fleet
1950 - Old Rockport
1949 - Ace Admiral
1948 - Shannon
1947 - Olhaverry
1946 - Occupy
1944 - Okana
1941 - Joy Boy
1940 - Specify

References

 1948 Time magazine article on Shannon and his win in the Argonaut Handicap
 New York Times article on Hillsdale's win in the 1959 Argonaut Handicap

Discontinued horse races
Horse races in California
Hollywood Park Racetrack
Graded stakes races in the United States
Recurring sporting events established in 1940
Recurring sporting events disestablished in 1978
1940 establishments in California
1978 disestablishments in California